The Samarkand Challenger is a tennis tournament held in Samarkand, Uzbekistan since 1996. The event is part of the ATP Challenger Tour and is played on outdoor clay courts.

Singles

Doubles

External links
Official website

 
ATP Challenger Tour
Samarkand
Recurring sporting events established in 1996
Tennis tournaments in Uzbekistan
Clay court tennis tournaments
1996 establishments in Uzbekistan